The Christian Democratic People's Party (KDNP) is a right-wing Christian democratic political party in Hungary. It is officially a coalition partner of the ruling party, Fidesz, but is mostly considered a satellite party of Fidesz, and has been unable to get into the Parliament on its own since the 1990s (with the last time it did so being 1994), being unable to pass the election threshold of 5% of the vote. Without Fidesz, its support is now low enough that it can no longer be measured, and even a leading Fidesz politician, János Lázár, stated that Fidesz does not consider the government to be a coalition government.

History 

The party was founded under the name of KDNP on 13 October 1944 by Hungarian Catholic statesmen, intellectuals and clergy, and was a successor to the pre-war United Christian Party. Among the founders were Bishop Vilmos Apor, Béla Kovrig (president of the University of Cluj-Napoca), Count József Pálffy, ethnographer Sándor Bálint and political journalist István Barankovics. It was an offshoot of the Catholic Social Folk Movement (KSzN), a civil organization. At the beginning of 1945 they elected Barankovics as principal secretary.

The new KDNP enjoyed just four or five months of semi-legality towards the end of World War II. At the end of the war, the communist-dominated post-war authorities refused to legalize it or permit it to operate further. Despite attempts by Varga and Barankovics, they were refused official permission to operate and take part in elections. Some of the party's founders, including Varga, were imprisoned for some days by detachments of the Arrow Cross Party.

Meanwhile, some party members were saying that Barankovics conceded too much to the communist-influenced authorities in return for too little, and there was growing friction between two factions: the Christian socialist left wing led by Barankovics and the conservative-clerical right wing led by József Mindszenty's confidant, József Pálffy. The left wing gained increasing ascendancy in the party, and on 8 May 1945, Barankovics replaced Pálffy as president. The party changed its name to the Democratic People's Party (DNP), while a group led by Pálffy founded a new party called KDNP, which, however, failed to remain legal in an atmosphere of increasing Soviet influence. The 1947 elections saw the DNP finish second in the popular vote, winning 60 of the 411 seats.

DNP was a democratic and anticommunist organisation. In 1949, Mátyás Rákosi asked Barankovics for the party's leaders to help him in the show trial against Cardinal Mindszenty, who was already ill in prison. Barankovics refused and, abandoning his party, escaped to Austria in an American diplomat's car. Many people followed his example; others were imprisoned by communists. The party was subsequently dissolved in January 1949.

Refoundation and present 

The party was refounded in 1989 with its present name. The link between the historical party and the present one is disputed, although prominent members of the original party, like László Varga, took part in its refoundation. The party won 21 seats in the 1990 parliamentary election and entered the government with the Hungarian Democratic Forum (MDF) and the Independent Smallholders, Agrarian Workers and Civic Party (FKgP) and, later, the United Smallholders' Party (EKGP).

In the 1994 election, KDNP won 22 seats in the National Assembly and moved into opposition to the new coalition between the Hungarian Socialist Party (MSZP) and the Alliance of Free Democrats (SZDSZ). It lost all of its seats in the 1998 election.

In 2002 it formed a joint list with the Centre Party but again it did not manage to win any seats.

In 2005 KDNP signed an agreement with Fidesz for election cooperation, a result of which the KDNP obtained seats in the National Assembly. In the 2006 elections this alliance gained strength, winning 42.0% of the list votes and 164 representatives out of 386 in the National Assembly. The party decided to form a self-contained parliamentary faction with 23 representatives.

The Fidesz-KDNP Alliance won the 2010 election, with the KDNP increasing its seats to 36; party leader Zsolt Semjén was appointed Deputy Prime Minister and Minister for National Politics. The alliance won again in the 2014 and 2018 election, although KDNP decreased its seats to 16. The party currently holds two ministers in the Fourth Orbán Government: party leader Zsolt Semjén (Deputy Prime Minister and Minister for National Politics, Church Affairs and Nationalities) and János Süli (Minister for the planning, construction and commissioning of the two new blocks at Paks Nuclear Power Plant).

The party is considered by many to have become a satellite party of Fidesz. Without Fidesz, its support cannot be measured, and even a leading Fidesz politician, János Lázár stated in 2011 that Fidesz does not consider the government to be a coalition government.

KDNP is a member of the European People's Party (EPP). Although its ally Fidesz's membership has been suspended on 20 March 2019, and its MEPs left the European People's Party group on 3 March 2021, KDNP retained its European affiliation and their only MEP György Hölvényi remained the sole member of the EPP group from Hungary thereafter.

Ideology
KDNP is a right-wing, conservative Christian democratic party. It is well known in Hungary for its traditional-marriage, anti-abortion and anti-immigration stance, and its representatives voted against the Treaty establishing a Constitution for Europe because it did not refer to Europe's Christian heritage, although the party does not consider itself Eurosceptic.

KDNP has supported the severe restriction on Sunday shopping ("free Sunday", as they called) for a long time, citing Christian values. Parliament voted on the issue on December 14, 2014 and the law came into effect on March 15, 2015 (a Sunday on which shops would have been closed anyway, the day being a public holiday in Hungary). Public opinion was predominantly against the decision. Three polls done in the spring of 2015 registered an opposition of 64% (Szonda Ipsos), 62% (Medián) 59% (Tárki). By the end of May, according to a poll by Medián, 72% of those polled disliked the new law, even the majority of Fidesz-KDNP voters were against it. Opposition parties and private persons tried to start a public referendum several times. By November 2015 there were 16 such attempts, but none of them were approved, for various bureaucratic reasons, until in early 2016 one of these attempts, initiated by the Hungarian Socialist Party, was finally successful. The government, rather than being forced to hold the referendum (which could have been interpreted as a huge success for the opposition party, even though the law was opposed by the majority of Fidesz voters too) lifted the ban in April 2016.

Parliamentary representation

National Assembly

European Parliament

See also
 Politics of Hungary

Sources

External links
Official website

1989 establishments in Hungary
Anti-communism in Hungary
Agrarian parties in Hungary
Anti-communist parties
Catholic political parties
Christian democratic parties in Hungary
Conservative parties in Hungary
National conservative parties
Formerly banned political parties
Member parties of the European People's Party
Political parties established in 1943
Political parties established in 1989
Social conservative parties
Right-wing parties in Europe